Magadiite is a hydrous sodium silicate mineral (NaSi7O13(OH)3·4(H2O)) which precipitates from alkali brines as an evaporite phase. It forms as soft (Mohs hardness of 2) white powdery monoclinic crystal masses. The mineral is unstable and decomposes during diagenesis leaving a distinctive variety of chert (Magadi-type chert).

The mineral was first described by Hans P. Eugster in 1967 for an occurrence in Lake Magadi, Kenya, and is also found at Olduvai Gorge, Tanzania. It is also reported from alkalic intrusive syenites as in Mont Saint-Hilaire, Canada.

References

Phyllosilicates
Sodium minerals
Monoclinic minerals
Minerals in space group 12